Sayers Classical Academy is a private, classical Christian school located in Louisville, Kentucky, United States.  It serves students from Pre-K through 12th grade. 

The school is named after Dorothy Sayers, whose essay, "The Lost Tools of Learning," has been highly influential in the modern resurgence of classical education.

See also
List of schools in Louisville, Kentucky

References

Christian schools in Louisville, Kentucky
Private high schools in Kentucky
Private middle schools in Kentucky
Private elementary schools in Kentucky
Educational institutions established in 1991
High schools in Louisville, Kentucky
1991 establishments in Kentucky
Classical Christian schools